Valtteri is a forename. It is the Finnish form of Walter. Notable people with the name include:

Valtteri Bottas (born 1989), Finnish racing driver
Valtteri Filppula (born 1984), Finnish ice hockey forward
Valtteri Hietanen (born 1992), Finnish ice hockey player
Valtteri Hotakainen (born 1990), Finnish ice hockey player
Valtteri Järviluoma (born 1993), Finnish ice hockey player
Valtteri Jokinen, Finnish judoka
Valtteri Karnaranta (born 2002), Finnish ice hockey player
Valtteri Kemiläinen (born 1991), Finnish ice hockey player
Valtteri Moren (born 1991), Finnish footballer
Valtteri Laurell Pöyhönen (born 1978), Finnish jazz guitarist and bandleader
Valtteri Parikka (born 1994), Finnish ice hockey player
Valtteri Pihlajamäki (born 1996), Finnish ice hockey player
Valtteri Puustinen (born 1999), Finnish ice hockey player
Valtteri Vesiaho (born 1999), Finnish footballer
Valtteri Viljanen (born 1994), Finnish ice hockey player
Valtteri Virkkunen (born 1991), Finnish ice hockey player

Finnish masculine given names